Kay Mills may refer to:

 Kay Mills (writer) (1941–2011), journalist and author
 Kathleen Mills (1923–1996), Irish camogie player

See also
  Kay Mills Cup
 Katy Mills, an outlet shopping mall in Katy, Texas
 Kay Miller